Elementary is the third and final album released by the Canadian band The End. This album is a departure from their mathcore sound present on their first two albums and is more rock-oriented, featuring lighter melodies and clean vocals mixed with growling.

Track listing
 "Dangerous" - 6:08
 "The Never Ever Aftermath" - 4:45
 "Animals" - 3:26
 "The Moth and I" - 5:29
 "Throwing Stones" - 3:29
 "My Abyss" - 4:50
 "Awake?" - 3:43
 "A Fell Wind" - 4:02
 "In Distress" - 5:54
 "And Always..." - 9:18

References

The End (Canadian band) albums
2007 albums
Relapse Records albums
Dine Alone Records albums